In organic chemistry, the chloroacetic acids (systematic name chloroethanoic acids) are three related chlorocarbon carboxylic acids:

 Chloroacetic acid (chloroethanoic acid), CH2ClCOOH
 Dichloroacetic acid (dichloroethanoic acid; bichloroacetic acid, BCA), CHCl2COOH
 Trichloroacetic acid (trichloroethanoic acid), CCl3COOH

Properties 
As the number of chlorine atoms increases, the electronegativity of that end of the molecule increases, and the molecule adopts a progressively more ionic character: its density, boiling point and acidity all increase.

{| class="wikitable sortable"
! Acid || Melting point (°C) || Boiling point (°C) || Density (g/cm3) || pKa
|-
| Acetic acid || 16.5 || 118.1 || 1.05 || 4.76
|-
| Chloroacetic acid || 61–63 || 189 || 1.58 || 2.87
|-
| Dichloroacetic acid || 9.5 || 194 || 1.57 || 1.25
|-
| Trichloroacetic acid || 57 || 196 || 1.63 || 0.77
|}

Production 

 Chloroacetic acid is mainly made by hydrolysing trichloroethylene in the presence of sulfuric acid:
 CCl2=CHCl + 2 H2O → CH2ClCOOH + 2 HCl
 Dichloroacetic acid is manufactured in small quantities by reducing trichloroacetic acid.
 Trichloroacetic acid is made by directly reacting chlorine with acetic acid using a suitable catalyst.

Uses 

 Chloroacetic acid is chemical intermediate for production of various pharmaceuticals and insecticides.
 Trichloroacetic acid is used for various analytic tests in biochemistry. In sufficient concentration it will cause protein, DNA and RNA to precipitate out of solution.
 The sodium salt of trichloroacetic acid is used as a weedkiller.

Safety 

All of these acids are unusually strong for organic acids, and should generally be treated with similar care as for strong mineral acids like hydrochloric acid. Even neutral salts however, tend to be significantly toxic, because the ions interfere in biological processes (such as the citric acid cycle) that normally process plain acetate ions. The chloroacetate anion is the most toxic, with a rat, oral  of about 0.5 g/kg.

References

Carboxylic acids
Organochlorides